Chhaila Babu (English language: Cool Guy) is a 1967 Bollywood comedy drama film directed by Kalpataru. The film was released under the banner of R. H. Mullan Productions.

Cast
 Bhagwan Dada
 Salim Khan
 Kumari Naaz
 Rajendra Nath
 Tun Tun
 Leela Mishra
 Zeb Rehman
 Ranjana Kadam

Soundtrack
"Tum Sanwarte Ho To" - Chitalkar Ramchandra, Asha Bhosle
"Rahee Hu Albela Mai Dil Kaa Nahee Maila" - Mukesh
"Kyon Jhukee Jhukee Hain Palke" - Mukesh, Lata Mangeshkar
"Tere Pyar Ne Mujhe Ghum Diya" - Mohammed Rafi

References

External links 
 

1967 films
1960s Hindi-language films
Films scored by Laxmikant–Pyarelal
Indian comedy-drama films